William Bagwell (1776 – 4 November 1826) was an Irish Tory politician who served for more than twenty years as a Member of Parliament (MP) in the United Kingdom House of Commons.

He was the son of John Bagwell, M.P., and Mary, née Hare.   He was the Member of Parliament for Rathcormack in the Parliament of Ireland from 1798 until the Union with Great Britain at the end of 1800, when the constituency of Rathcormack was disenfranchised.

He was elected at a by-election in 1801 as MP for constituency of Clonmel in the Parliament of the United Kingdom and held that seat until his resignation in 1819 to fight a by-election for the Tipperary seat when the prior member succeeded to the Irish Peerage as Earl of Glengall. He won the seat and held it until the 1826 general election

He resided at the family mansion at Marlfield, Clonmel.

Sources 
A genealogical and heraldic history of the commoners of Great Britain and Ireland John Burke, 1838

External links 

|-

1776 births
1826 deaths
Irish MPs 1798–1800
Members of the Parliament of the United Kingdom for County Tipperary constituencies (1801–1922)
UK MPs 1801–1802
UK MPs 1802–1806
UK MPs 1806–1807
UK MPs 1807–1812
UK MPs 1812–1818
UK MPs 1818–1820
UK MPs 1820–1826
Tory MPs (pre-1834)
Politicians from County Tipperary
Irish Conservative Party MPs
Members of the Privy Council of Ireland
Tory members of the Parliament of the United Kingdom
Members of the Parliament of Ireland (pre-1801) for County Cork constituencies
People from Clonmel